cBR96-doxorubicin immunoconjugate (BMS-182248/SGN-15; also known as cBR96-Dox) is an antibody-drug conjugate or (ADC) directed to the Lewis-Y antigen designed for the treatment of cancer. The payload is the chemotherapy drug doxorubicin which is connected with a hydrazone linker to cysteine residues of the Lewis-Y specific (chimeric) monoclonal antibody BR96. Following internalization, the hydrazone is hydrolyzed within the acidic environment of target cell endosomes and lysosomes to release active cytotoxic drug.

Clinical Development
In clinical trials cBR96-Dox was found to be highly active in regressing large human tumor xenografts implanted in mice or rats. Multiple tumor models including lung, breast and colon were evaluated, and cBR96-Dox was found to have broad and potent anti-tumor activity, even in doxorubicin-resistant tumors.

References 

Monoclonal antibodies
Unnamed monoclonal antibodies
Antibody-drug conjugates